Transparent is a rock band from upstate New York consisting of Matthew Sassano, Bradley Meise, and Quintin Olix . Transparent's song, "Bridges" is the main menu song on NASCAR The Game: Inside Line that was released on November 6, 2012. The band released their first full-length album, Light in Darkness, with 11 original songs on June 6, 2013. They have opened for bands such as Project 86, Scarlet White, and Cry to the Blind. The band was formed in October 2010. Their logo consists of a pink and purple ribcage.

History
Lead singer and songwriter, Matthew Sassano was always involved in the music and arts within church and within his local scene from a young age. A video performance on YouTube of the band Skillet inspired him to start his own band as well as a trip in October 2010, when Sassano and now band manager, Steve Cox drove out to Indiana to see a Ron Paul campaign and when they returned, they started the band. The first song written was "Paranoid".  A 4 song demo was released in July 2011. In October 2011, Matthew went out to New Mexico to visit family and during that trip, he wrote "Bridges". More songs were written and all recording for the full-length album "Light in Darkness" was completed in October 2012.

"Bridges"
"Bridges" is based on the prodigal son in the Bible. The song almost got thrown out initially because of the drum interpretation by a previous drummer before Jesse Sprinkle. It became the main menu song on NASCAR The Game: Inside Line for Xbox 360, PlayStation 3 and Nintendo Wii. During the summer and fall of 2012, Alfred State College Digital Media Animation students made the music video for "Bridges". The music video director was Jeremy Schwartz, a professor for the Digital Media Department and has worked on Robot Chicken on Cartoon Network.

Originally, the song "New World Order" was supposed to be the song on the game but was switched out for "Bridges".

https://archive.today/20130217013934/http://dullko.wordpress.com/2012/11/26/lectureart-gallery-3-transparent-music-video/
http://lraewilson.wordpress.com/2012/11/15/bridges-gallery-opening-set/

Light in Darkness 

Light in Darkness is the first full-length album by the New York rock band, Transparent, which was released on June 6, 2013. The album has 11 original songs and was album was recorded over the span of 2011-2012.

References

http://www.eveningtribune.com/article/20131125/NEWS/131129789
https://web.archive.org/web/20121229002814/http://www.eveningtribune.com/news/x35739744/Local-band-s-song-featured-on-new-video-game
https://archive.today/20130122155601/http://www.eveningtribune.com/news/x137170794/Local-band-s-song-featured-in-video-game
https://www.facebook.com/transparentband/info
http://www.biogamergirl.com/2012/11/closer-look-into-transparent-light-in.html
WENY TV interview http://www.weny.com/news/local-news/localbandgoesnational
http://www.last.fm/user/fabrykamagazine/journal/2012/05/05/5gbwcp_transparent_-_bridges_-_song_review_2011_nu_metal_alternative_rock
https://plus.google.com/u/0/110672807017683277156/posts/eJs13cdVkfv
https://archive.today/20130217013934/http://dullko.wordpress.com/2012/11/26/lectureart-gallery-3-transparent-music-video/
http://www.1776again.com/ok-i-had-to-make-a-post-about-the-band-transparent/
Underground Uproar Interview https://m.facebook.com/note.php?note_id=328696563856687&_ft_=fbid.327847917278569&_rdr
https://www.youtube.com/transparentrockband

External links
 Official website
 Official YouTube
 Picture 1

Rock music groups from New York (state)
Alternative rock groups from New York (state)
American Christian rock groups
Musical groups established in 2010
Hornell, New York
2010 establishments in New York (state)